Renée Cretté-Flavier (20 August 1902 – 25 May 1985) was a French diver. She competed in the women's 10 metre platform event at the 1928 Summer Olympics.

References

External links
 

1902 births
1985 deaths
French female divers
Olympic divers of France
Divers at the 1928 Summer Olympics
Place of birth missing
20th-century French women